"I'll Always Love My Mama" is a 1973 single by the Philly soul group The Intruders. Released from their album Save the Children, the single is a song commonly played on Mother's Day.

Written by Gamble & Huff and co-written by McFadden & Whitehead, the song reached #36 on the pop chart and #6 on the R&B charts in the summer of 1973. It was recorded as a long LP track, which was broken down into Parts 1 and 2 for the single release. The song was inspired by Kenny Gamble's mother, Ruby, who died in 2012. It was used during the credits of The Simpsons episode "Moe Letter Blues".

References

Songs about mothers
1973 singles
The Intruders (band) songs
Songs written by Leon Huff
Songs written by Gene McFadden
Songs written by John Whitehead (singer)
1973 songs
Songs written by Kenny Gamble
Philadelphia International Records singles